Gary Allan High School (GAHS) is a public secondary school located in Halton Region, Ontario, Canada. GAHS, part of the Halton District School Board.

GAHS is oriented towards adult, alternative and Community Education programs.

Gary Allan High School is named after Gary Allan, a Canadian educator.

The school uses the site that was previously General Brock High School.

References

External links
Gary Allan High School
Gary Allan Bio

High schools in the Regional Municipality of Halton
Educational institutions established in 1960
1960 establishments in Ontario